Statistics of Japanese Regional Leagues for the 1984 season.

Champions list

League standings

Hokkaido

Tohoku

Kanto

Hokushinetsu

Tokai

Kansai

Chūgoku

Shikoku

Kyushu

1984
Jap
Jap
3